The following is a list of notable bands associated with riot grrrl from the early 1990s to the present, mainly in the United States and United Kingdom.

NB: some of these bands significantly pre-dated the original riot grrrl era (e.g. Frightwig, Fifth Column, Mecca Normal, Scrawl, L7), while others may be more accurately categorized as grunge – see also 'foxcore' (e.g. Lunachicks, Babes in Toyland, Dickless, Calamity Jane), alternative rock (e.g. Jack Off Jill), hardcore (e.g. Spitboy, Pantychrist), garage punk (e.g. Red Aunts), queercore (e.g. Tribe 8, Team Dresch, the Third Sex, Sta-Prest, the Butchies, the Need), post punk/no wave (e.g. Erase Errata), digital hardcore (Lolita Storm) or indiepop (e.g. Angelica).

Other bands did not identify with riot grrrl during its first wave of the early 1990s but became associated via personal and artistic connections (e.g. 7 Year Bitch), or by fans and/or the media due to aesthetic and genre similarities (e.g. Hole, The Gits). Such groups have sometimes been called "riot grrrl adjacent". On the same basis bands continue to be associated with or self-identify as riot grrrl up to the present day.  However, the problematisation of riot grrrl, and of its status as music genre, have led to the label being disputed.

A list of notable bands that specifically self-identified as riot grrrl during the initial early 1990s period would be very small, potentially including only Bikini Kill, Bratmobile, Heavens to Betsy, Excuse 17, Emily's Sassy Lime and Lucid Nation in the US, and Huggy Bear, Linus, Pussycat Trash and Skinned Teen in the UK.

#
7 Year Bitch

A
Adickdid
Angelica

B
Babes in Toyland
Bangs
Big Joanie
Bikini Kill
Blood Sausage
Bratmobile
The Butchies

C
Cadallaca
Calamity Jane
Care Bears on Fire
Casual Dots
The Coathangers
Cold Cold Hearts
Coping Saw
Courtney Love

D
Dickless
Dominatrix 
Dream Nails
Dream Wife

E
The Element of Crime
Emily's Sassy Lime
Erase Errata
The Ethical Debating Society
Excuse 17

F
Fabulous Disaster
Fifth Column
Finally Punk
Frantic Spiders
Free Kitten
Frightwig
The Frumpies

G
The Gits
Gossip (early)
gSp
GURR

H
Hole (early)
Heartless Martin
Heavens to Betsy
Huggy Bear

J
Jack Off Jill
The Julie Ruin

K
Kenickie (early)
Kitten Forever
Kate Nash (after 2010)
The Kut

L
L7
Le Tigre
The Linda Lindas
Linus
Lois
Lolita Storm
Lucid Nation
Lunachicks
Lung Leg

M
Mambo Taxi
Mecca Normal
Mika Miko

N
The Need
Nots

O
Otoboke Beaver

P
Pantychrist
Partyline
Period Pains 
Petty Crime
Phantom Pregnancies
Pussycat Trash
Pussy Riot

Q
The Quails

R
Red Aunts 
Red Monkey
The Regrettes

S
Scrawl
Screaming Females
The Shondes
Shoplifting
Shrag
Sister George
Skating Polly
Skinned Teen
Skinny Girl Diet
Slant 6
Sleater-Kinney

Spider and the Webs
Spitboy
Sta-Prest
Suture
Swan Island

T
Tacocat
Tattle Tale
Team Dresch
The Third Sex
Throwing Up
Tribe 8

Tunabunny
The Tuts

V
Voodoo Queens

W
Wetdog
Wild Flag 
White Lung
The Wimmins' Institute

See also
Queercore
All-female band

References

Riot grrrl
Lists of women in music
Lists of punk bands